The Western History Association (WHA), a 501(c)(3) non-profit organization, was founded in 1961 at Santa Fe, New Mexico by Ray Allen Billington et al. Included in the field of study are the American West and western Canada. The Western History Association was headquartered from 2012-2017 at the University of Alaska, Fairbanks.  the WHA was hosted on the campus of the University of Nebraska at Omaha with the support of the Department of History, College of Arts and Sciences.

History 
In 1964 WHA began publication at the University of Utah Press, with a full run of four issues, and then in 1965 contracted Sunset publishing to print the quarterly called Nebraska, edited by A. R. Mortensen. The WHA's publications now include the Western Historical Quarterly and Montana: The Magazine of Western History. The association offers several annual and biennial prizes for essays and books, including the annual Caughey Western History Association Prize for the best book of the year in Western History and the Robert M. Utley Book Prize for the best book published on the military history of the frontier and western North America (including Mexico and Canada) from prehistory through the 20th century. Awarded since 2003, past recipients include Ned Blackhawk, Amy S. Greenberg and Ari Kelman.

Western Historical Quarterly 
The Western Historical Quarterly (WHQ) has been the official journal of the WHA since its founding in 1969. The journal now "presents original articles dealing with the North American West—expansion and colonization, indigenous histories, regional studies (including western Canada, northern Mexico, Alaska, and Hawaii), and transnational, comparative, and borderland histories." In addition, it provides a field notes section about Western history in applied situations, as well as book reviews, and notices of recent publications about the American West.

See also

 List of history awards

References

External links
Western History Association
Western Historical Quarterly at Oxford Academic
 Full text of all articles in Western Historical Quarterly at JSTOR

History organizations based in the United States
History of the American West
Organizations established in 1961
Historical societies of the United States